State Route 172 (SR-172) is a state highway in the U.S. state of Utah connecting 6200 South and West Valley City to SR-201 and I-80 via 5600 West in a span of . The highway was formed in 1985.

Route description
The route begins at the junction of 6200 South and 5600 West and heads due north on the latter as a two-lane undivided highway, with wide shoulders on each side. Past the intersection of SR-173, the road widens to four lanes. Past the diamond interchange at SR-201, the route loses two lanes in each direction. The highway continues in this manner until it terminates at the diamond interchange at I-80.

All of SR-172 has been included in the National Highway System.

History
State Route 172 was formed in 1985 by the Utah Transportation Commission. Since the route's formation, it has not been changed.

Major intersections

References

172
 172
 172
Streets in Utah